Aloysius Martin "Tod" Sloan (November 30, 1927 – July 12, 2017) was a Canadian professional ice hockey player. He played in the National Hockey League (NHL) for the Toronto Maple Leafs and Chicago Black Hawks. He was a member of three Stanley Cup championship teams: 1949 and 1951 in Toronto, and 1961 in Chicago.

Career
Sloan played junior hockey with the St. Michael's Majors.  He began his professional career with the Pittsburgh Hornets of the American Hockey League in the 1946–47 season and was called up for one game by the Toronto Maple Leafs in 1947–48. In 1948–49, Sloan played 29 regular-season games with Toronto;  he did not play in the playoffs and his name was left off the Stanley Cup, but he appeared in the Maple Leafs' 1949 team picture.  He played eight full seasons for the Leafs and won the Stanley Cup with them in 1949 and 1951.

In 1958, Sloan and teammate Jimmy Thomson were traded from Toronto to Chicago because of their activities in organizing the National Hockey League Players' Association. Sloan played three seasons for the Black Hawks and won the Stanley Cup with them in 1961.  His name was incorrectly engraved on the Cup as "Martin A. Sloan".

Sloan retired from professional ice hockey in 1961.  The following season, he joined the Galt Terriers senior team and played with the Canadian national ice hockey team in the 1962 IIHF world championship before retiring completely from competitive ice hockey.

Sloan was a cousin of Dave Keon, another longtime member of the Maple Leafs.  He lived in Sutton, Ontario in his final years and died in Newmarket, Ontario on July 12, 2017 at the age of 89.

Awards
 1946 - OHA-Jr. MVP
 1951, 1952, 1956 - Played in NHL All-Star Game
 1956 - NHL Second All-Star Team
 1956 - J.P. Bickell Memorial Award

Source: Hockey Hall of Fame

Career statistics

References

External links

1927 births
2017 deaths
Anglophone Quebec people
Canadian ice hockey forwards
Chicago Blackhawks players
Ice hockey people from Quebec
People from Outaouais
Pittsburgh Hornets players
Stanley Cup champions
Toronto Maple Leafs players
Toronto St. Michael's Majors players